Nihon Falcom is a Japanese video game development and publishing company founded in 1981. While the company has actively developed video games since their inception, their games were not consistently localized and published until the 2010s. The company originally focused on developing games for Japanese personal computers. In the 2000s, the company moved into developing games for Sony's PlayStation brand, particularly the PlayStation Portable, while continuing development on PCs on Windows, to reach a broader demographic. The move was internally seen as a success, and broadened their fanbase in Western territories, leading the company to put greater emphasis into English translations and releases of their games in the 2010s. Since the 2010s, the company generally releases one game per year. By the end of the decade, the company started seeing success in porting their games to the Nintendo Switch platform, leading them to start internal development on the Switch moving into the 2020s, alongside an even greater push for multi-platform publishing.

Video games

See also
Faxanadu - a game in the Xanadu series that was outsourced to Hudsonsoft.
 Ys 4 original releases were outsourced to other companies, and not developed by Falcom. This includes Ys IV: The Dawn of Ys, developed by Hudsonsoft for the PC Engine in 1993, Ys IV: Mask of the Sun by Tonkin House for the Super Nintendo, and Ys IV: Mask of the Sun - A New Theory by Taito for the PlayStation 2. The only version of Ys 4 to be developed by Falcom was Ys Memories of Celceta.
 Ys Strategy - a 2006 entry into Falcom's Ys series outsourced to another development team for release on the Nintendo DS.

References

Nihon Falcom